Fumarylacetoacetate hydrolase domain-containing protein 1, also known as FLJ36880 protein, is an enzyme that in humans is encoded by the FAHD1 gene on chromosome 16.

Structure 

The FAHD1 gene encodes for a 24-kDa protein that is localized to the mitochondrion and belongs to the fumarylacetoacetate hydrolase family of proteins. The structure of FAHD1 has been resolved using X-ray crystallography at 2.2-Å resolution. The overall structure is similar to the C-terminal domain of the bifunctional enzyme HpcE from Escherichia coli C, fumarylacetoacetate hydrolase from Mus musculus and to YcgM (Apc5008) from E. coli 1262. A number of conserved amino acids including Asp-102 and Arg-106 of FAHD1 appear to be important for its catalytic activity.

Function 

The FAHD1 protein has been shown to function as an oxaloacetate decarboxylase in eukaryotes. The FAHD1 protein probably also functions as an acylpyruvase, having been shown to catalyze the hydrolysis of acetylpyruvate and fumarylpyruvate in in vitro experiments.  Mg(2+) was required for maximal enzyme activity.

References

Further reading

Genes
Human proteins